The Motorola Q9m is a smartphone that uses Windows Mobile 6.0. This particular phone is for use with Verizon Wireless. It is capable of playing music, videos and photos. It also offers the V CAST service which was not previously available on the Motorola Q9c. It has a full qwerty keyboard and a 1.3-megapixel camera. It is also Bluetooth compatible. It has 64 MB of on board memory and can accept mini SDHC cards. Its display resolution is 320x240 widescreen. It features Office To Go for viewing and editing documents.

External links 
CNET Review

Q9M
Windows Mobile Standard devices